Konrad Krafft von Dellmensingen (24 November 1862 – 21 February 1953) was a Bavarian Army general in World War I.  He served as Chief of the General Staff of the Royal Bavarian Army before World War I and commanded the elite Alpenkorps, the Imperial German Army's mountain division formed in 1915.

Early life

Krafft von Dellmensingen was born into a lower-ranking Bavarian noble family in Laufen, Upper Bavaria.  His father was a royal notary.  Konrad entered the Royal Bavarian Army as an officer candidate in August 1881 and was commissioned a second lieutenant in December 1883. After attending the Bavarian War Academy, he served as a general staff officer in various units. In 1902 he married Helene Zöhrer in Vienna, Austria-Hungary. They had two sons and one daughter.

Through the prewar years, Konrad Krafft von Dellmensingen proceeded up the ranks, generally alternating command and general staff assignments, until October 1, 1912, when he became Chief of the General Staff of the Royal Bavarian Army, a position he would hold until the mobilization for war in August 1914.

World War I

On mobilization in 1914, Generalmajor Krafft von Dellmensingen became chief of the general staff of the German 6th Army, and served with that command in the Battle of the Frontiers and the Race to the Sea.  On May 27, 1915, shortly after his promotion to Generalleutnant, he took command of the newly formed Alpenkorps, a provisional mountain division. He would lead the division until the end of February 1917, through fighting on the Italian Front, at Verdun, and in the invasions of Serbia and Romania (see Battle of Sălătrucu).  He received the Pour le Mérite, Prussia's highest military honor, on September 13, 1916, and oak leaves to the Pour le Mérite on December 11, 1916, as well as honors from Bavaria, other German states, and their Austro-Hungarian and Ottoman allies.

On March 1, 1917, Krafft von Dellmensingen became chief of staff of Army Group Duke Albrecht of Württemberg, where he served until September 9, 1917.  On September 11, 1917, he received the Commander's Cross of the Württemberg Military Merit Order, Württemberg's highest military decoration. He then became chief of staff of the 14th Army under Otto von Below, and helped plan the operation that would become the successful Battle of Caporetto.  On October 24, 1917, he received the Grand Cross of the Military Order of Max Joseph, Bavaria's highest military decoration.

On February 2, 1918, the 14th Army in Italy was dissolved and the army's staff under Otto von Below took command of the 17th Army, newly formed for the German spring offensive in France.  After helping prepare the army for the offensive, Konrad Krafft von Dellmensingen was promoted to General der Artillerie and given command of the II Bavarian Army Corps, which he led from April 18, 1918, through the German spring offensive and the defensive battles that followed to the war's end.

Post-war

Konrad Krafft von Dellmensingen retired from the army in December 1918. He was active in monarchist circles after the war seeking a return of the Bavarian monarchy. He also participated in the 1920s in the preparation of the official history of the Bavarian Army in the war: in 1926 and 1928, he edited a 2-volume account of the Battle of Caporetto, Der Durchbruch am Isonzo (The Breakthrough on the Isonzo).

In 1937, a barracks complex in Garmisch-Partenkirchen was named the "Krafft-von-Dellmensingen-Kaserne".  In 1945, the Kaserne was taken over by the United States Army. The program of denazification was launched after the end of the Second World War; the name “Krafft-von-Dellmensingen-Kaserne” was deleted.  On 9 July 1975 this decision was reversed; the barracks were named after Dellmensingen again. Today this building houses part of the George C. Marshall European Center for Security Studies.
The name "Krafft-von-Dellmensingen-Kaserne" was removed from the outside of the barracks on 29 June 2011.
Krafft von Dellmensingen had died in Seeshaupt, Upper Bavaria.

Decorations and awards
 Order of the Red Eagle; 3rd class
 Pour le Mérite (13 September 1916); Oak Leaves added on 11 December 1916 
 Commander of the Württemberg Military Merit (11 September 1917)
 Grand Cross of the Military Order of Max Joseph
 Order of the Iron Crown (Austria), 1st class

References

 Rudolf von Kramer, Otto Freiherr von Waldenfels und Dr. Günther Freiherr von Pechmann: Virtuti Pro Patria: Der königlich bayerische Militär-Max-Joseph-Orden (München 1966). Includes a biography of Konrad Krafft von Dellmensingen.
 Short biography (with some errors)
 Curriculum vitae with picture

Notes

1862 births
1953 deaths
People from the Kingdom of Bavaria
People from Berchtesgadener Land
German untitled nobility
German Army generals of World War I
Bavarian generals
Grand Crosses of the Military Order of Max Joseph
Recipients of the Pour le Mérite (military class)
German monarchists